Albert William Frederick Diaper (11 February 1909 – 25 May 1995) was an English professional footballer who played in the Football League for Aldershot, Luton Town and Fulham as a wing half.

Personal life 
Diaper was a carpenter by trade.

Career statistics

References 

Clapton Orient F.C. wartime guest players
English Football League players
1909 births
1995 deaths
Footballers from Southampton
English footballers
Association football wing halves
Cowes Sports F.C. players
Arsenal F.C. players
Luton Town F.C. players
Fulham F.C. players
Charlton Athletic F.C. players
Aldershot F.C. players
Guildford City F.C. players
Aldershot F.C. wartime guest players
English carpenters
20th-century British businesspeople